Hamptons is a residential neighbourhood in the northwest quadrant of Calgary, Alberta. It is located close to the northern edge of the city, and is bounded to the north by Stoney Trail, to the east by Shaganappi Trail, to the south by Country Hills Boulevard, and to the west by Sarcee Trail.

The land was annexed in two stages, the southern area in 1976 and the northern one in 1989. The Hamptons was established as a neighbourhood in 1990. It is represented in the Calgary City Council by the Ward 2 councillor.

The community is home to an Olympic size hockey rink and an annual Stampede breakfast.

Demographics 

Residents in this neighbourhood had a median household income of $125,042 in 2005, and 5.6% of its residents were within low income households. Also as of 2005, 44.9% of the residents were immigrants while, in 2006, 84.6% of occupied private dwellings were single detached homes, and only 2.3% of all occupied private dwellings were rented.

Education 
The community is served by the Hamptons School (K-4). Students then move on to Captain John Palliser Elementary For Grades 5-6. Then Move onto Tom Baines School (7-9) For Junior High. For High School Students go to Sir Winston Churchill High School (10-12).

Homeowners association 
The Hamptons Homeowners Association maintains a community website with access to information on events, recreation, and other information; as well as an archive of the "Your Hamptons" newsletter in PDF format.

See also 
List of neighbourhoods in Calgary

References

External links 
Hamptons Community Association
Hamptons Homeowners Association

Neighbourhoods in Calgary